Sukhanovka is the name of several rural localities in Russia:
Sukhanovka, Penza Oblast, a selo in Yasnopolyansky Selsoviet of Kuznetsky District of Penza Oblast
Sukhanovka, Dalnerechensky District, Primorsky Krai, a selo in Dalnerechensky District, Primorsky Krai
Sukhanovka, Khasansky District, Primorsky Krai, a railway station in Khasansky District, Primorsky Krai
Sukhanovka, Pskov Oblast, a village in Nevelsky District of Pskov Oblast
Sukhanovka, Sverdlovsk Oblast, a selo in Artinsky District of Sverdlovsk Oblast
Sukhanovka, Tula Oblast, a village in Fedorovskaya Rural Administration of Uzlovsky District of Tula Oblast